Ravča is a village in Croatia. It is connected by the D512 highway. Since December 2008, the A1 motorway has an eponymous exit located west of the village.

References

Populated places in Split-Dalmatia County